Richard II (died 1105/06), called the Bald, was the count of Aversa and the prince of Capua from 1090 or 1091. He was under the guardianship of Count Robert of Caiazzo until he came of age in 1093.

The eldest son and successor of Jordan I of Capua and Gaitelgrima, daughter of Prince Guaimar IV of Salerno, he was named after his grandfather, Richard I of Capua.  While digressing on this impressive lineage, the chronicler William of Apulia in his The Deeds of Robert Guiscard says that he "though now only a young man, already shows courage worthy of an adult."

He succeeded to his father's dominions at a very young age and immediately he and his family were thrown out of their city by the capricious Capuans. The counts of Aquino rose in rebellion and attacked Soria, defended by Richard's uncle, Jonathan, Count of Carinola.

Richard was an exile for the next seven years (during which a Lombard named Lando IV reigned) until, upon reaching his majority, he requested the aid of his great uncle, the count of Sicily, Roger I, and his first cousin once removed, the duke of Apulia, Roger Borsa. The two Rogers came, the former in exchange for the city of Naples and the latter for Richard's recognition of Apulian suzerainty, in May 1098 and besieged Capua for forty days.

It was an interesting siege, for Pope Urban II, embroiled in a controversy with Count Roger, came down to discuss the legatine power in Sicily with him and Anselm of Aosta, the archbishop of Canterbury in self-exile from King William II of England, came to meet the pope.  With the aid of Sicilian Saracens, the city fell and the prince was reinstated, Apulian suzerainty acknowledged, and the pope and the count withdrew to Salerno.

The final eight years of his reign were uneventful and he left no heir and was succeeded by his younger brother Robert when he died (in 1105 or, more probably, 1106).  Though he had accepted doing homage to the Hauteville duke of Apulia, his successors did not and Capua returned to de facto independence under them. Richard's confessor was Bishop Bernard of Carinola.

Sources
William of Apulia, The Deeds of Robert Guiscard Books One (pdf)
Norwich, John Julius. The Normans in the South 1016-1130. Longmans: London, 1967.

|-

|-

1106 deaths
Italo-Normans
Norman warriors
Counts of Aversa
Princes of Capua
Year of birth unknown